Saúl Octavio Sánchez Graciano (born April 3, 1973, in Orizaba, Veracruz) is a football goalkeeper. He last played for the club Estudiantes de Altamira, in the Mexican Liga de Ascenso.

Club career
Sánchez played in numerous clubs throughout his career in México, including Puebla F.C., La Piedad, Dorados de Sinaloa, Lagartos de Tabasco, Club Tijuana, Club Celaya, Querétaro FC and Real Colima.

After a brief retirement in 2007, he returned to play and help Mérida to attempt to be promoted to Primera División de México.

References

External links
 
 
 

1973 births
Living people
Mexican footballers
Association football goalkeepers
Club León footballers
Club Puebla players
La Piedad footballers
Dorados de Sinaloa footballers
Lagartos de Tabasco footballers
Club Celaya footballers
Querétaro F.C. footballers
C.F. Mérida footballers
Altamira F.C. players
Liga MX players
Ascenso MX players
Footballers from Veracruz
People from Orizaba